Singled Out Eleanor McEvoy's is a 2009 compilation album of singles taken from McEvoy's four award-winning independently released albums. Three of the albums, Yola, Out There, and Love Must Be Tough, received the coveted Album of the Year Award from Hi-Fi+ Magazine.
Early Hours was voted Best Contemporary Album 2004–2005 by Irish Music Magazine Readers Poll. The album includes Did I Hurt You and Isn't It A Little Late from McEvoy's double A-Side single which was the world's first single to be released on the on Super Audio Compact Disc SACD format.
Singled Out  is marked by McEvoy's unmistakable voice and her singular treatment of love, lust, and humour. It distinctively chronicles McEvoy's progression from a band format to a solo artist with a clear vision of her own music.

Singled Out  includes one new song, "Oh Uganda", which was written by McEvoy after her visit to Northern Uganda as part of her support for the work of Oxfam Unwrapped. Oxfam Ireland describes McEvoy's visit to the Kitgum region of Uganda saying, "McEvoy returned to Ireland following a week-long trip to Uganda with Oxfam Ireland. The Dublin musician experienced first hand the benefits of Oxfam Ireland Unwrapped, an initiative that sends meaningful presents like clean drinking water, schoolbooks and vegetable gardens to developing countries throughout Africa". Oh Uganda includes harmony vocals from Ugandan singer Florence Mutesasira.

Critical reception

In an era of homogeneous, packaged artists who find a niche and cling on for dear life, McEvoy is constantly changing, genre, style and delivery. This album is sub-titled “The Independent Singles” but could just as easily be called “From Yola to Uganda” or “The Greatest Should Be Hits”. Over 15 vocal tracks plus a bonus DVD performance of one song you get a showcase of a major singer/songwriter and a collection of tracks that will amuse, delight and often make you think.

Track listings

Single
 Oh Uganda

References

Eleanor McEvoy albums
2009 compilation albums